Charles Franklin, the pen-name of Frank Hugh Usher, (22 October 1909 - 1976) born in Leicester, Leicestershire, a British writer of mystery novels and spy novels.  He also wrote under the pen-names Frank Usher, and Frank Lester.

Biography
Little interested in the whodunit, still in vogue in England in the immediate post-war period, he followed in the footsteps of Peter Cheyney and David Hume and showed a clear penchant for Noir fiction and, less surprisingly, from the 1960s, for spy novels.

Under the pseudonym Charles Franklin, he published his first novel, Exit Without Permit, in 1946, with his most famous recurring hero, Grant Garfield, a young and intrepid lawyer, sometimes assisted in his twelve investigations, by his charming secretary Barbara Wenthworth. After abandoning Garfield, he wrote three novels for Inspector Jim Burgess, and three others for the spy Maxine Dangerfield, a kind of female James Bond. He also published under Charles Franklin's name historical works dealing with famous legal or criminal cases.

Under his birth name, he was the author of the adventures of Daye Smith, a portrait painter and amateur sleuth. He also used this name for his fantasy short stories and a short series of spy novels centred on the duo of Amanda Curzon and her sidekick Oscar Sallis.

Works

Novels

Grant Garfield series

Inspector Jim Burgess series
 Guilt for Innocence (1960)
 Kill Me and Live (1961)
 The Bath of Acid (1962)

Maxine Dangerfield series
 The Dangerous Ones (1964)
 On the Day of the Shooting (1965)
 The Escape (1968)

Other novels

Daye Smith series (by Frank Usher)

Amanda Curzon and Oscar Sallis series (by Frank Usher) 
 The Man From Moscow (1965)
 No Flowers in Brazlov (1968)
 The Boston Crab (1970)
 Deadly Legacy (1971)

Other novels by Frank Usher 
 Fear Runs Softly (1961) 
 Body in Velvet (1963)

Geoffrey Slade series (by Frank Lester) 
 The Corpse Wore Rubies (1958)
 Death in the South Wind (1958) 
 The Golden Murder (1959) 
 Death of A Pale Man (1960) 
 The Bamboo Girl (1961) 
 Hide My Body (1961) 
 Fly Me a Killer (1962)

Other novels by Frank Lester 
 Death of a Frightened Traveller (1959)
 Lead Me to the Gallows (1962) 
 Finch Takes to Crime (1963)

Short stories by Frank Usher

Other publications by Charles Franklin 
 The World’s Worst Murderers (1965) 
 The World’s Famous Trials (1967) 
 The World’s Greatest Scandals (1967) 
 Spies of the Twentieth Century (1967) 
 They Walked a Crooked Mile: an Account of the Greatest Scandals, Swindlers and Outrages of All Time (1967) 
 World Famous Acquittals (1970)

References

Sources

 
 
 

British detective fiction writers
20th-century British writers
1909 births
1976 deaths
20th-century pseudonymous writers